Bègues is a commune in the Allier department in central France.

Geography

Population

Administration 
 2008–2014: Georges Beaumet
 2014–2020: Alain Viguié
 2020–current: Serge Maume

See also
Communes of the Allier department

References

Communes of Allier
Allier communes articles needing translation from French Wikipedia